The 1991 Chevrolet Classic was a tennis tournament held in Guarujá in Brazil and played on hardcourt. It was part of the 1991 ATP Tour. It was the sixth edition of the tournament and took place from February 4 through February 11, 1991.

Finals

Singles
 Patrick Baur defeated  Fernando Roese 6–2, 6–3
 It was Baur's 1st title of the year and the 3rd of his career.

Doubles
 Olivier Delaître /  Rodolphe Gilbert defeated  Shelby Cannon /  Greg Van Emburgh 6–2, 6–4
 It was Delaître's 1st title of the year and the 1st of his career. It was Gilbert's only title of the year and the 1st of his career.

 
Chevrolet Classic
Guarujá Open